Ken Ikeda (born 24 February 1982) is a Canadian former gymnast. He competed in the team final at the 2004 Summer Olympics.

References

External links
 

1982 births
Living people
Canadian male artistic gymnasts
Olympic gymnasts of Canada
Gymnasts at the 2004 Summer Olympics
Sportspeople from Kamloops